The women's 75 kilograms event at the 2006 Asian Games took place on December 5, 2006 at Al-Dana Banquet Hall in Doha.

Schedule
All times are Arabia Standard Time (UTC+03:00)

Records

Results 
Legend
NM — No mark

 Mya Sanda Oo of Myanmar originally won the silver medal, but was disqualified after she tested positive for Metabolite.

New records
The following records were established during the competition.

References

 Weightlifting Database
 Results

Weightlifting at the 2006 Asian Games